Natco Pharma is an Indian multinational pharmaceutical company based in Hyderabad. The company manufactures finished dosage formulations active pharmaceutical ingredients and crop health science products, and also provides contract manufacturing services. It is a major producer of branded oncology medicines and hepatitis C drugs. The company specialises in producing complex medicines at affordable prices. In 2019, Natco launched its crop health sciences division.

History 
 In 2003, Natco Pharma launched Veenat, a generic version of Novartis AG's anti-cancer drug Glivec. It won the subsequent patent protection legal battle against Novartis in 2013. 
 In 2012, Natco Pharma obtained compulsory license to produce a cheaper and generic version of Bayer's anti-cancer medication Nexavar. 
 In the United States, it launched influenza medication Tamiflu with marketing partner Alvogen, multiple sclerosis treatment drug glatiramer acetate in partnership with Mylan, and hepatitis C drugs under a licensing agreement with Gilead Sciences.
 In 2015, Natco Pharma started production of Sofosbuvir in Nepal.
 In 2016, Natco Pharma launched the first Tamiflu capsule in the US market.
 In 2017, Natco Pharma launched a generic version of blood cancer drug Pomalidomide at a 98% discount to the drug's selling price in the United States.
 In 2019, Natco Pharma initiated work on green-field manufacturing facilities for producing niche agrichemical products in Nellore district, Andhra Pradesh.

External links 
 Official website

References

Pharmaceutical companies of India
Manufacturing companies based in Hyderabad, India
Pharmaceutical companies established in 1981
1981 establishments in Andhra Pradesh
Indian companies established in 1981
Companies listed on the National Stock Exchange of India
Companies listed on the Bombay Stock Exchange